Ivan Vilibor Sinčić (born 28 August 1990), or simply Ivan Sinčić, is a Croatian politician and anti-eviction activist, chairman of the Human Shield party and member of the European Parliament since 2019.

Biography 

Sinčić was born in Karlovac. He completed his undergraduate studies at the Faculty of Electrical Engineering in Zagreb.

In 2016 he married fellow Human Blockade activist and former party co-chairwoman Vladimira Palfi. They have a son named Ksaver and a daughter called Iskra.

Along with now-fellow MP Ivan Pernar, Sinčić was one of the founders of Human Blockade in 2011.

Sinčić was a candidate in the first round of the 2014 Croatian presidential election, coming in third with 16.42% of the vote.

He was first elected a Member of the Croatian Parliament in the 2015 parliamentary election, from the 7th electoral district, and took office on 28 December 2015. He was reelected to Parliament in the 2016 parliamentary election.

On 26 May 2019, he was elected to the European Parliament but he announced that he won't take up his seat.  
On 4 June 2019, the presidency of his party decided that Sincic would still occupy his seat in the European Parliament because he won the most preferential votes in the elections held on 26 May 2019.

Views
It has been stated that he "believes in abolishing private banks". Sinčić was against Croatian government decision to grant 3600 HRK (approx. 486€) of monthly financial aid to Ukrainian refugees arriving to Croatia.

References

External links
 Home | Ivan Vilibor SINČIĆ | MEPs | European Parliament

1990 births
Living people
Candidates for President of Croatia
Croatian activists
Croatian politicians
People from Karlovac
Representatives in the modern Croatian Parliament
MEPs for Croatia 2019–2024